Nycteromyces is a genus of fungi in the family Laboulbeniaceae. This is a monotypic genus, containing the single species Nycteromyces streblidinus.

References

External links
Nycteromyces at Index Fungorum

Laboulbeniaceae
Monotypic Laboulbeniomycetes genera
Laboulbeniales genera